Montarlot is a former commune in the Seine-et-Marne department in the Île-de-France region in north-central France. On 1 January 2016 it was merged into the new commune of Moret-Loing-et-Orvanne.

See also
Communes of the Seine-et-Marne department

References

External links

1999 Land Use, from IAURIF (Institute for Urban Planning and Development of the Paris-Île-de-France région) 

Former communes of Seine-et-Marne